Tavan Bogd Group (Mongolian: Таван Богд групп) is a Mongolian conglomerate with 14 subsidiaries and four affiliates in trades and services, manufacturing, financial services and mining supplies along with restaurant, tourism and hospitality businesses in Mongolia. Established in 1995, Tavan Bogd Group is one of the largest corporations in Mongolia, officially representing some of the world’s best-known brands such as Toyota, Volkswagen, Hitachi mining equipment, Colgate Palmolive, TOTO, L’Occitane, KFC, Pizza Hut, Bridgestone, Heinz, Funai, Xerox and Double A. In addition, Tavan Bogd Group sells luxury cashmere products through the GOBI Corporation, which currently operates about 140 boutique stores in 40 countries.

The Group is one of the largest employers in the country with nearly 10,000 employees across its subsidiaries and affiliated companies. It was named after the highest mountain range in western Mongolia, the Altai Tavan Bogd.

Company history

The Tavan Bogd Group was established in 1995, by Baatarsaikhan Tsagaach and his spouse, Khulan Dashdavaa. Tsagaach is the president and Dashdavaa is the executive vice president of the company. Tavan Bogd started out as a photo-processing business and authorised distributor of Fujifilm Corporation. Since its foundation, the company has expanded and established subsidiaries across Mongolia. In the 2000s, Tavan Bogd acquired the GOBI Corporation, one of the "Global Big Five" luxury cashmere manufacturers. The company then acquired shares in Khan Bank, the largest commercial bank in Mongolia, and fully acquired Juulchin, the nation’s first and most reputable tour operator. In 2014, the Tavan Bogd Group established a joint venture with Catering International & Services (CIS), to provide services in the field of mining supplies and catering in southern Mongolia.

Subsidiaries

Tavan Bogd Trade LLC 

Tavan Bogd Trade is the holding company of the Tavan Bogd Group, in charge of the strategic alignment of subsidiary companies and development of new businesses.

Tavan Bogd LLC 

In 2013, Tavan Bogd LLC became the authorised distributor of Toyota Corporation. Tavan Bogd LLC also operates a Toyota-Authorized Service Station, providing maintenance, diagnostics, car parts and other services to Toyota customers in Mongolia. The company imports tires and car parts produced by Bridgestone.

Ulaanbaatar Flour LLC 

Founded in 2002, Ulaanbaatar Flour LLC is a flour production company based in Darkhan-Uul Province. The company’s factory has a milling capacity of approximately 100,000 tons per year. The company has one of the largest market shares in flour productions and sales in the country.

Tavan Bogd Management 

Tavan Bogd Management engages in document technology products of Xerox and execution of IT systems of Oracle and Hitachi. The company owns and operates the Ulaanbaatar Print Factory and the Xerox Centre. Additionally, the company is an official distributor of XEROX and DOUBLE A, an integrated pulp and paper production company based in Thailand.

Tavan Bogd Foods 

Since establishing an agreement with the globally known American fast food company YUM! in 2012, Tavan Bogd Foods launched the first-ever Kentucky Fried Chicken (KFC) restaurants in Mongolia. As of April 2017, Tavan Bogd Foods operated 10 KFC restaurant branches in the capital city, Ulaanbaatar.

Tavan Bogd Foods Pizza LLC 

Tavan Bogd Foods Pizza acquired a license for pizza delivery franchising of Pizza Hut from YUM! in  2014, and delivers pizzas throughout Ulaanbaatar through its 11 franchising centers.

Tavan Bogd International 

Tavan Bogd International LLC imports food and household products to Mongolia from companies such as Colgate-Palmolive, Unicharm, LG, Heinz, Ferrero.

Juulchin LLC 
 
In 2005, Tavan Bogd Group acquired Juulchin LLC, an international tour operator headquartered in Ulaanbaatar. The company specializes in both inbound and outbound trips across Mongolia. The company was established in 1954, and was the first tour operator in Mongolia.

Kempinski Khan Palace Hotel 

In 2005, the Tavan Bogd Group opened the Kempinski Khan Palace Hotel in Ulaanbaatar. The hotel is part of the Kempinski Hotel chain and is one of the first 5-star hotels to operate in Ulaanbaatar. The Kempinski contains business conference, reception and ballroom event halls.

Tavan Bogd Smart Electronics LLC 
Founded in 2009, Tavan Bogd Smart Electronics sells electric appliances, including Dirt Devil vacuum cleaners from Germany and VAX carpet services from Great Britain.

Airlink Mongolia LLC 

Airlink Mongolia LLC conducts air ticketing services for Aero Mongolia, Hunnu Airlines, MIAT from Mongolia and Aeroflot, Air Astana, Air China, Korean Air, Singapore Airlines, Turkish Airlines and UNITED from overseas countries.

Tavan Bogd Washyoku 

Tavan Bogd Washyoku is a restaurant company that owns Sakura, Nagomi I, Nagomi II, and Mirage, all located in Ulaanbaatar.

Mongol Machine Concern 
Founded in 2001, Mongol Machine Concern specialises in group-wide catering and property management services.

Juulchin Duty Free (JDF) JSC 

Tavan Bogd Group acquired Gazar Suljmel JSC in September 2016, and renamed it as the Juulchin Duty Free JSC to focus on travel retail businesses in Mongolia.

Associated Companies

Khan Bank 

Khan bank is the largest commercial bank in Mongolia with 541 branches across the country, and delivering financial services to customers, small- to medium-level business owners and corporate clients. Khan Bank has the largest number of ATMs installed throughout the nation and also operates internet, mobile, and SMS banking services. The holding company of Tavan Bogd Group, Tavan Bogd Trade LLC, owns shares of Khan Bank.

GOBI JSC 

GOBI manufactures luxury cashmere and wool clothing. It operates a fully integrated raw material processing to final production factory in Ulaanbaatar. GOBI sells camel wool, yak molt, and cashmere products through 140 stores in 40 countries.

Support Services Mongolia (SSM) LLC 

Founded in 2014, Support Services Mongolia (SSM) LLC, a joint-stock company between Tavan Bogd Trade LLC and CIS France, delivers camp services to road construction, civil construction, mining, power plant and geological exploration businesses. SSM helps build camp sites and provides catering services including food, laundry and maintenance. SSM customers include some of Mongolia’s largest companies such as the Oyu Tolgoi LLC, which is in charge of developing one of the largest copper and gold mines in southern Mongolia.

ZAMine Services LLC 

Established in 2011, ZAMine services LLC is an official distributor of Hitachi Construction Machinery Corporation in Mongolia, a joint venture investment between the Marubeni Corporation and the Tavan Bogd Group. It supplies equipment and parts to clients in Mongolia, and offers maintenance services.

Business Departments

Tavan Bogd Automotive LLC 

Since 2004, the Tavan Bogd Automative LLC has also become the official distributor of Volkswagen automobiles. In 2005, the company opened the Volkswagen Aftersales Center, a diagnosis and repair shop for Volkswagen, Audi, Porsche, Skoda and Bentley. In January 2017, the Automative established a distributor’s partnership with HANKOOK, a South Korean tire company.

ТОТО 

TOTO sells restroom and bathroom utilities equipment. In 2011, Tavan Bogd Trade LLC became TOTO’s representative company in Mongolia.

L’occitane 

Tavan Bogd Trade is an authorised distributor of L’Occitane, an international retailer in personal care products, based in France. Tavan Bogd Trade LLC officially introduced L’Occitane brand in 2010, and opened two boutique stores at the Central Tower and the Ulaanbaatar Department store.

Godiva Mongolia 

In May 2017, Tavan Bogd is expected to open a Godiva chocolate Boutique Store at the Shangri-La Commercial Center in downtown Ulaanbaatar.1

Conglomerate companies of Mongolia
Companies based in Ulaanbaatar